Puşcaş is a Romanian surname. Notable people with the surname include:

George Pușcaș (born 1996), Romanian football player
Ioan Puşcaş (born 1932), Romanian physician
Vasile Louis Puscas (1915–2009), American Roman Catholic bishop
Vasile Pușcaș (born 1952), Romanian politician and diplomat
Victor Puşcaş (born 1943), Moldovan politician

See also
 Puskás

Romanian-language surnames